Mid Lincolnshire, formally called the Mid Division of Lincolnshire, was a county constituency in  Lincolnshire.  It returned two Members of Parliament (MP) to the House of Commons of the Parliament of the United Kingdom, elected by the bloc vote electoral system.

History

The constituency was created by the Reform Act 1867 for the 1868 general election.  It was abolished by the Redistribution of Seats Act 1885 for the 1885 general election.

Boundaries 
1868–1885: In the Parts of Lindsey, the Wapentakes, Hundreds, or Sokes of Well, Lawress, Wraggoe, Gartree, Candleshoe, Calceworth (except so much as lies within the Hundred of Louth Eske), Hill, Bolingbroke, Horncastle, and in the Parts of Kesteven, the Wapentakes, Hundreds, or Sokes of Boothby Graffoe, and Langoe, and Lincoln Liberty.

Members of Parliament

Election results 

Chaplin was appointed Chancellor of the Duchy of Lancaster and Stanhope was appointed Vice-President of the Committee of the Council on Education, requiring a by-election.

References 

Parliamentary constituencies in Lincolnshire (historic)
Constituencies of the Parliament of the United Kingdom established in 1868
Constituencies of the Parliament of the United Kingdom disestablished in 1885